Rumen Trifonov (born 21 February 1985) is a former Bulgarian professional footballer who played as a defender. He is currently working as a youth coach for CSKA Sofia.

Career
Trifonov earned his first call-up to the Bulgaria national side in March 2011 for the Euro 2012 qualifier against Switzerland and the friendly match versus Cyprus, but did not feature in these games.

On 22 February 2018, Trifonov joined Third League club Spartak Pleven. In June 2018, he moved to Second League side Montana.

Later career
Missing the most of the 2019-20 season due to an injury in the autumn 2019, 35-year old Trifonov decided to retire at the end of the year. 

In February 2020 he returned to PFC CSKA Sofia as a youth coach, where he became head coach of the players from 2004 and would also help the U17 team. Beside that, he also signed for OFK Kostinbrod in March 2020.

Awards
 Bulgarian Cup 2011 with CSKA Sofia
 Bulgarian Supercup 2012 with CSKA Sofia

References

1985 births
Living people
People from Vratsa Province
Bulgarian footballers
Association football fullbacks
First Professional Football League (Bulgaria) players
PFC CSKA Sofia players
OFC Vihren Sandanski players
PFC Minyor Pernik players
PFC Chernomorets Burgas players
FC Lokomotiv 1929 Sofia players
I liga players
Miedź Legnica players
FC Septemvri Sofia players
PFC Spartak Pleven players
Second Professional Football League (Bulgaria) players
FC Montana players
OFC Pirin Blagoevgrad players
Bulgarian expatriate footballers
Bulgarian expatriate sportspeople in Poland
Expatriate footballers in Poland